The Egypt women's national under-16 and under-17 basketball team is a national basketball team of Egypt, governed by the Egyptian Basketball Federation. It represents the country in international under-16 and under-17 (under age 16 and under age 17) women's basketball competitions.

World Cup record

See also
Egypt women's national basketball team
Egypt women's national under-19 basketball team
Egypt men's national under-17 basketball team

References

External links

Archived records of Egypt team participations

Women's national under-17 basketball teams
Basketball